Valley High School or Valley School is a 1A public high school located west of Turkey, Texas (USA). It is part of the Turkey-Quitaque Independent School District that covers eastern Briscoe County and western Hall County. The school was formed by the consolidation of Turkey and Quitaque high schools in 1972. In 2011, the school was rated "Recognized" by the Texas Education Agency.

Athletics
The Valley Patriots compete in the following sports:

Baseball
Basketball
Cross Country
6-Man Football

State Finalists

Girls Basketball - 
1973(1A)

Football - 
2004(6M), 2005(6M)

References

External links
Turkey-Quitaque ISD
List of Six-man football stadiums in Texas

Public high schools in Texas
Public middle schools in Texas
Public elementary schools in Texas